Pan de yuca (Spanish for Cassava bread) is a type of bread made of cassava starch and cheese typical of western Ecuador and southern Colombia

History
An 1856 watercolor by Manuel María Paz shows cassava bread being prepared by members of the Saliva people in Casanare Province.

Gallery

See also 
 Cheese bun

References

Colombian cuisine
Cassava dishes
Latin American breads